The 1987 Kouros 1000 km Spa was the ninth round of the 1987 World Sports-Prototype Championship.  It took place at the Circuit de Spa-Francorchamps, Belgium on September 13, 1987.

Official results
Class winners in bold.  Cars failing to complete 75% of the winner's distance marked as Not Classified (NC).

Statistics
 Pole Position - #61 Kouros Racing Team - 2:04.040
 Fastest Lap - #61 Kouros Racing Team - 2:09.300
 Average Speed - 164.337 km/h

References

 
 

Spa
Spa
6 Hours of Spa-Francorchamps